The Henderson State Reddies college football team represents Henderson State University in the Great American Conference (GAC). The Reddies compete in Division II of the National Collegiate Athletic Association (NCAA). The program has had 18 head coaches since it began play in 1905.

The team has played 1,028 games in 116 seasons of Reddie football. In that time, Scott Maxfield led the Reddies to four postseason bowl games. Seven coaches have won conference championships: Bo Rowland, Bo Sherman, Duke Wells, Jim Mack Sawyer, Clyde Berry, Sporty Carpenter, and Scott Maxfield. Jimmy Haygood also claimed four Arkansas state championships.

Sporty Carpenter is the leader in seasons coached and games won, with 119 victories during his 19 years at Henderson. J.H. Lassiter has the highest winning percentage with .833. Patrick Nix has the lowest winning percentage with .136. 

The current head coach is Scott Maxfield, who was hired in 2005.

Key

Coaches

Notes

References 

Arkansas sports-related lists
Henderson State